Komoto or Kōmoto is a surname. Notable people with the surname include:

Akiko Kōmoto, Japanese voice actress
Akira Komoto, Japanese artist and photographer
Hiroto Kōmoto (born 1963), Japanese rock singer who has fronted bands such as The Blue Hearts, The High-Lows and The Cro-Magnons
Hiroyuki Komoto (born 1979), Japanese football player
Saburo Komoto (born 1950), Japanese politician of the Liberal Democratic Party